Christer George (born 11 August 1979 in Oslo) is a Norwegian former football player. His twin brother Michael plays handball on professional level.

References

1979 births
Living people
Norwegian footballers
Norway international footballers
Skeid Fotball players
Strømsgodset Toppfotball players
Rosenborg BK players
Córdoba CF players
Aarhus Gymnastikforening players
Footballers from Oslo
Norwegian twins
Norwegian expatriate footballers
Norwegian expatriate sportspeople in Spain
Expatriate men's footballers in Denmark
Expatriate footballers in Spain
Danish Superliga players
Eliteserien players
Twin sportspeople
Norwegian people of Trinidad and Tobago descent
Association football midfielders